Andrea Hlaváčková and Peng Shuai were the defending champions, but Peng could not participate due to injury. Hlaváčková played alongside Lucie Hradecká, but lost in the quarterfinals to Casey Dellacqua and Yaroslava Shvedova.
Martina Hingis and Sania Mirza won the title, defeating Chan Hao-ching and Chan Yung-jan in the final, 6–7(9–11), 6–1, [10–8].

Seeds
The top four seeds received a bye into the second round.

Draw

Finals

Top half

Bottom half

References
 Main Draw

Women's Doubles